There are sporting events held in United Arab Emirates.

Football

Football is one the most popular sports in the country.

Motorsport

A motorsport race was the 1981 Dubai Grand Prix held at a purpose-built circuit in Deira Corniche and from 2010 the Abu Dhabi Grand Prix was held at the end of the season.

Cricket

Dubai is home to the International Cricket Council.

Badminton
BWF's "grassroots" programme, Shuttle Time Dubai, aims to broaden badminton's appeal and raise its profile in the emirate by working with 40 schools on how to teach and engage youth in the sport. The ‘BWF Destination Dubai World Superseries Finals’ leg was scheduled to be the first time the international tournament is hosted in the Middle East and enables the sport to connect with a whole new region of fans, explains BWF President Poul-Erik Høyer in his interview to Vision.

Camel racing

Inhabitants of Arab States of the Persian Gulf have practiced camel racing. Robot jockeys have been used after government regulations were passed prohibiting underage jockeys from racing.

In 2021, an all-female camel racing team is formed.

The cloning industry has been receiving demands from customers wanting to reproduce better racing camels for competitions. Where a female camel may reproduce one calf in every two years, cloning industries have increased this number to an average of 10 to 20 babies every year. Animal rights groups have raised concerns regarding the process which causes the animals providing egg cells and carrying embryos to "undergo undue suffering".

Cycling
There are places to cycle in Dubai, including Nad Al Sheba Cycle Path, Al Qudra Cycle Path and Jumeirah Open Beach Track. There is a 30 km cycling lane in Dubai's desert. Since 1 October 2019 cyclist risk to get their cycle confiscated if they ride outside of some cycle lanes in the city. Not wearing protective gear can also lead to confiscation of a cycle.

Endurance riding

Mohammed Bin Rashid Al Maktoum is an endurance rider. The Dubai Endurance City has practiced the sport and there are endurance yards.

Falconry
Falconry is practiced.

Golf
The 2013 DP World Tour Championship at Jumeirah Golf Estates delivered a US$44 million gross economic benefit to Dubai, according to research commissioned by tournament organisers, The European Tour.

Ice hockey

In 2018, new president of the Emirates Ice Hockey League (EHL) Vladimir Burdun was appointed. His role was to strengthen UAE ice hockey team and attract more business opportunities.

In 2019, Burdun announced the goal of entering a team in Kontinental Hockey League (KHL) which involved teams from Belarus, China, Finland, Latvia, Kazakhstan, Russia, and Slovakia by 2021. He also aimed at getting more players ready for KHL. A new ice arena was expected to open in Abu Dhabi, possibly before the end of 2019, with a seating capacity of 17,000 and that venue would meet all the requirements of KHL. The plan was to replicate the "success" of a NHL team situated in deserts, Vegas Golden Knights. KHL and former NHL players, such as Pavel Datsyuk, Sergei Mozyakin, Alexander Ovechkin were mentioned as prospects who might help to increase the future team's competitiveness.

Squash
Squash lessons are available from ex-professionals and a Dubai Open Squash is even held with a $25,000 cash prize to the winner.

Table tennis
Ping Pong Dubai is a nonprofit community initiative aimed at encouraging people from all walks of life to pick up a bat and play table tennis.

References

External links